The 2020–21 season was Real Madrid's 90th in existence, their 65th consecutive season in the top flight of Spanish basketball and 14th consecutive season in the EuroLeague. It was also the tenth season in a row under head coach Pablo Laso.

Times up to 24 October 2020 and from 28 March 2021 were CEST (UTC+2). Times from 25 October 2020 to 27 March 2021 were CET (UTC+1).

Overview

Pre-season
Real Madrid started up its hunt for its 11th Turkish Airlines EuroLeague crown with the beginning of training camp for the 2020–21 season. Madrid head coach Pablo Laso called together his team knowing he won't have a lot of new faces to incorporate. Madrid did not make many major changes during the off-season as Laso retained nearly his enter roster from last season, when the team went 22–6 in the EuroLeague for second place when the season was halted by the COVID-19 pandemic. Real Madrid opened the EuroLeague Regular Season on October 2 with a road game against TD Systems Baskonia.

Players

Squad information

}

Depth chart

Transactions

In

|}

Out

|}

Pre-season and friendlies

Friendly matches

Competitions

Overview

Liga ACB

League table

Results summary

Results by round

Matches

ACB Playoffs

Quarterfinals

Semifinals

Finals

EuroLeague

League table

Results summary

Results by round

Matches

EuroLeague Playoffs

Quarterfinals

Copa del Rey

Supercopa de España

Statistics

Liga ACB

Source:

EuroLeague

Source: EuroLeague

Copa Del Rey

Source: ACB

Supercopa de España

Source: ACB

References

External links
 

 
Real Madrid
Real Madrid